The Dickinson State Normal School Campus District in Dickinson, North Dakota is a  historic district that has work dating to 1922.  It includes Tudor Revival architecture.  It has also been known as Dickinson State Teachers College, Dickinson State College, and Dickinson State University.

It was listed on the National Register of Historic Places in 1997.  The listing included three contributing buildings and one other contributing site.

Among its many features is "a stone fence with gate posts".

References

University and college buildings on the National Register of Historic Places in North Dakota
Tudor Revival architecture in North Dakota
Dickinson State University
Historic districts on the National Register of Historic Places in North Dakota
National Register of Historic Places in Stark County, North Dakota
Arthur R. Nichols works
University and college campuses in North Dakota
Buildings and structures completed in 1922